The Legend of Lylah Clare is a 1968 American drama film released by Metro-Goldwyn-Mayer and directed by Robert Aldrich. The film stars Peter Finch, Kim Novak (in multiple roles), Ernest Borgnine, Michael Murphy, and Valentina Cortese. The film was based on a 1963 DuPont Show of the Week TV drama co-written by Wild in the Streets creator Robert Thom.

A satire on Hollywood, full of references to similar films, it recounts how an untalented beginner is hired to play the legendary Lylah Clare, a tempestuous actress who died mysteriously 20 years ago, and is herself consumed by the system. Although Aldrich's previous 1960s efforts were praised by critics, Lylah Clare opened to negative reviews.

Original TV drama
The Legend of Lylah Clare originally aired as a teleplay on the anthology series The DuPont Show of the Week on May 19, 1963, with Tuesday Weld in the title role and Alfred Drake as Lylah's director widower.

The show was made by the Directors Company, a production company formed by Franklin Schaffner and Fielder Cook to make some of the Dupont Dramas. Schaffner said if the audience could stay with the story until the last twenty minutes he would "guarantee nightmares". Robert Thom's script was described as a "modern Dybbuk".

Plot
Agent Bart Langner (Milton Selzer) finds Elsa Brinkmann (Kim Novak), a would-be actress who looks and sounds just like Lylah Clare, a flamboyant star who fell to her death in suspicious circumstances 20 years ago. He persuades arrogant director Lewis Zarkan (Peter Finch), who had been married to Lylah, to see her. The two men then convince brash studio head Barney Sheean (Ernest Borgnine), who is equally struck, to back a picture with her as Lylah.

Besides coping with the tyrannical Zarkan and easy access to alcohol and drugs, Elsa also has to contend with other hazards of Hollywood, such as malicious journalist Molly Luther (Coral Browne) and lesbian admirer, acting coach Rossella (Rossella Falk). As filming continues, her identification with her role gets more intense. She also begins to fall in love with Zarkan, who is happy to sleep with her but his priority is to get his film finished.

By the last day of shooting, her personality seems to have merged with that of the outrageous Lylah, whose fatal fall, we learn, was prompted by the jealous Zarkan. To antagonise him, she first lets him find her in bed with the gardener. Then, as he directs her in a circus scene, she leaps to her death from the high-wire. The resulting publicity makes his film a huge success. Tragedy later comes when Zarkan himself is shot and killed by Rossella.

A final sequence – in this case, a TV commercial for dog food that interrupts the film itself – suggests that the world of Hollywood is literally one of dog eats dog.

Cast

 Kim Novak as Lylah Clare/Elsa Brinkmann/Elsa Campbell 
 Peter Finch as Lewis Zarkan/Louie Flack 
 Ernest Borgnine as Barney Sheean 
 Milton Selzer as Bart Langner 
 Rossella Falk as Rossella 
 Gabriele Tinti as Paolo 
 Valentina Cortese as Countess Bozo Bedoni 
 Jean Carroll as Becky Langner 
 Michael Murphy as Mark Peter Sheean 
 Lee Meriwether as Young girl 
 James Lanphier as Legman #1 
 Robert Ellenstein as Mike 
 Nick Dennis as Nick 
 Dave Willock as Cameraman 
 Coral Browne as Molly Luther

Production
Film rights were purchased by Robert Aldrich who had made a number of films about Hollywood, notably The Big Knife and Whatever Happened to Baby Jane.

In October 1963, Aldrich announced he would make the film as part of a $14 million production program of eight films from Associates and Aldrich, including Cross of Iron, Whatever Happened to Cousin Charlotte?, The Tsar's Bride, Brouhaha, The Legend of Lylah Clare, Paper Eagle, Genghis Khan's Bicycle, and There Really Was a Gold Mine a sequel to Vera Cruz. He had prepared scripts on  Now We Know, Vengeance Is Mine, Potluck for Pomeroy and Too Late the Hero. Other projects were The Strong Are Lonely, Pursuit of Happiness and the TV series The Man.

In 1965, Aldrich announced that French star Jeanne Moreau would play the lead in Lylah Clare, However, filming was pushed back due to Aldrich being involved in other projects. He made it after The Flight of the Phoenix and The Dirty Dozen, both of which had predominantly male casts. The Dirty Dozen was financed by MGM who agreed to make Lylah. Aldrich said he was talking to the studio when they "were in a buying mood" and he pitched them Lylah, saying it was like The Big Knife.

Aldrich later said it had taken four years developing the script: "We tried to avoid making it Marienbad Revisited. It got terribly disjointed and the big problem was to make it legitimately disjointed and not arty-crafty disjointed."

In May 1967, Kim Novak was signed to play the lead. Hugo Butler and Jean Rouveral wrote the script. Novak hadn't made a film in three years, partly because she had been involved in a riding accident on the set of the film 13 (which became Eye of the Devil) and because she had lost interest in working. She had been divorced, and been involved in two car crashes and lost her house in a mud slide. Aldrich was initially thrilled with the idea of Novak in the role stating that she was a rare mixture of "ice and fire".  "There are only a handful of actresses who can immediately establish the image of a movie star," he said. "Kim is one".

Before filming Aldrich said "I admit Kim Novak is a gamble. The ideal director for Lylah Care is Losey. If I can get Novak to trust me I think she has the talent to pull it off. If she doesn't it's a dodgy bet." Novak said "I have been on both sides so I can identify with both characters." Aldrich said the Novak character was "an amalgamation of myths. The teleplay, which Tuesday Weld did, and did marvellously, was much more strikingly fashioned to fit the Monroe mould and we tried hard not to do that."

Aldrich said the theme of all his work was that it was about a "man who believes he can control his own destiny, even if he gets killed trying." He said the Finch character "gives in to his self destructive urges to go way beyond himself." Although the film was about a film director Aldrich said it was "autobiographical only in the sense that we may have exaggerated Peter Finch's impatience at suffering fools and that he has to be more patient than he's willing to be."

The male lead was Peter Finch who said he accepted it to work with Aldrich again, and because he wanted to work with Novak. Finch called the film a "Hollywood melodrama with bitter irony, an enormous sense of fun... It's right on the edge of being too much... Zarkan is one of those monsters who can charm people. He's passe, yet you have a sneaking admiration for him. There's something grand and theatrically right about him. Let's say we're a seedy lot in this picture - it's black Mahogany Gothic horror."

Francis Lederer was going to play a role but had to withdraw due to laryngitis and was replaced by Milton Seltzer.

Rehearsals started in June 1967 at MGM studios. Filming began in July 1967.

Reception

Critical response
The film received generally poor reviews and performed poorly at the box office. The film critic for Newsweek magazine stated that The Legend of Lylah Clare "fights clichés with clichés." Pauline Kael wrote, "there are groans of dejection at The Legend of Lylah Clare, with, now and then, a desperate little titter." Roger Ebert wrote the film was "awful ... but fairly enjoyable", while Lifes Richard Schickel felt that the film would catch on as a cult classic because it was "Not merely awful; it is grandly, toweringly, amazingly so...I laughed myself silly at Lylah Clare, and if you're in just the right mood, you may too."

Box-office
The film was a box-office failure with theatrical rentals of less than $1 million in the United States. Aldrich later said he understood the reasons, and did not think the film was well made but it developed a small cult reputation.

Aldrich's view
At various times, Aldrich blamed Novak's performance and bad editing for the film's failure. In 1972, Aldrich said "I think there are a number of faults with" the film. "I was about to bum rap Kim Novak, when we were talking about this the other day, and then I realized that would be pretty unfair. Because people forget that Novak can act. I really didn't do her justice. But there are some stars whose motion picture image is so firmly and deeply rooted in the public's mind that an audience comes to a movie with a pre-conception about that person. And that pre-conception makes "reality" or any kind of myth that's contrary to their pre-conceived reality impossible. To make this picture work, to make LYLAH work, you had to be carried along into that myth. And we didn't accomplish that.  [...]You can blame it on a lot of things, but I'm the producer and I'm the director. I'm responsible for not communicating that to the audience. I just didn't do it."

In 1977, Aldrich called Novak "the most underrated actress around. The reasons Lylah Clare failed was to do with me; she was badly served by her director. But take a look at her work in Middle of the Night - she was brilliant. I could never understand why after Picnic she was put in so much garbage."

Novak's view
"I probably shouldn't have made that picture," said Novak later. In 1996, she called it "a weird movie. It didn't have to be that bad." She was upset when she found out Aldrich had Hildegard Knef dub Novak in some lines in a deep German accented voice. "He didn't tell me. I thought I'd die when I saw the movie. God, it was so humiliating."

Home media
The Legend of Lylah Clare was released to DVD by Warner Home Video on October 4, 2011, via the Warner Archive DVD-on-demand system sold through Amazon.

See also
List of American films of 1968

References
Notes

Bibliography

External links
 
 
 
 
1963 TV Production at IMDb
Legend of Lylah Clare at BFI

1968 films
1968 drama films
American drama films
1960s English-language films
Films about actors
Films about Hollywood, Los Angeles
Films about reincarnation
Films based on television plays
Films directed by Robert Aldrich
Films scored by Frank De Vol
Films shot in Los Angeles
Metro-Goldwyn-Mayer films
1960s American films